James "Sugar Boy" Crawford, Jr. (October 12, 1934  – September 15, 2012) was an American R&B musician based in New Orleans. He was the author of "Jock-A-Mo" (1954), which was later rerecorded as "Iko Iko" by the Dixie Cups, and became a huge hit. The song was recorded by many other artists, including Dr. John, Belle Stars, the Grateful Dead, Cyndi Lauper, and (as "Geto Boys") by Glass Candy.

Life and career
Starting out on trombone, Crawford formed a band, which a local DJ, Doctor Daddy-O, named the Chapaka Shawee (Creole for "We Aren't Raccoons"), the title of an instrumental that they played. Crawford recalled, "During high school we had a little band, nothing real organized at first. I was back playing piano... The other fellows in the band were Edgar "Big Boy" Myles, Warren Myles, Nolan Blackwell, Irving "Cat" Banister, and Alfred Bernard- just a bunch of youngsters having fun."  The group was signed by Chess Records president Leonard Chess and was renamed Sugar Boy and his Cane Cutters.

His song "Jock-A-Mo" became a standard at the New Orleans Mardi Gras, but Crawford disappeared from public view. In a 2002 interview for Offbeat magazine he described how his career came to an abrupt halt in 1963, after a severe beating at the hands of state troopers incapacitated him for two years, forcing him to leave the music industry. In 1969, he decided to sing only in church. In 2012 he made a guest appearance singing gospel in an episode of the HBO series Treme. He died one month before the episode aired. James "Sugar Boy" Crawford was also Inducted into The Louisiana Music Hall Of Fame.

Crawford appeared on the 1995 album Let Them Talk, by Davell Crawford, his grandson. He made some stage appearances with Davell, including one at the New Orleans Jazz & Heritage Festival in 1996 and at the seventh annual Ponderosa Stomp in April 2008.

Among the artists Crawford recorded with was Snooks Eaglin.

Crawford died after a brief illness in a hospice in 2012, aged 77.

References

External links
 Marv Goldberg's R&B Notebooks: The Sha-Weez
 Limited James Sugar Boy Crawford and Shaweez Discography

1934 births
2012 deaths
Rhythm and blues musicians from New Orleans
Ace Records (United States) artists
Chess Records artists
Blues musicians from New Orleans
Singers from Louisiana
20th-century African-American male singers